Madabad (also Romanized as Mādābād) is a village in Mah Neshan Rural District, in the Central District of Mahneshan County, Zanjan Province, Iran. At the 2006 census, its population was 622, in 140 families.

References 

Populated places in Mahneshan County